The de Havilland Aeronautical Technical School was founded in 1928, initially to provide owners of de Havilland Moth aircraft with technical maintenance skills.

The Technical School was started at Edgware, London, England by Geoffrey de Havilland, founder of the de Havilland aircraft company, together with Frank Hearle. In 1934, the School moved to Hatfield, Hertfordshire, following the establishment of Hatfield Aerodrome there. The curriculum widened to cover the design, manufacture, and operation of aircraft in general. The instructors were engineers from the de Havilland company.

In 1940, the School was bombed by the Germans in a World War II raid and it was forced to move to Welwyn Garden City nearby. It then transferred to Salisbury Hall in 1941, now the location of the de Havilland Aircraft Museum. During 1947–48, the School was moved to Astwick Manor, to the north of Hatfield Aerodrome.

In 1963, the de Havilland company became part of Hawker Siddeley Aviation and the School was renamed to become the Hawker Siddeley Aviation (Hatfield) Apprentice Training School in 1965. Later it became part of Hatfield Polytechnic and then the University of Hertfordshire, moving to the College Lane campus.

There were also associated schools at Broughton, Christchurch, Lostock, and Portsmouth.

See also
 De Havilland T.K.1
 De Havilland T.K.2
 De Havilland T.K.4
 De Havilland T.K.5

References

External links 
 de Havilland Aeronautical Technical School Association website
 The Technical College c1965, Hatfield

Educational institutions established in 1928
1965 disestablishments in England
Aviation schools in the United Kingdom
Education in Hertfordshire
Aeronautical Technical School
Defunct aircraft manufacturers of the United Kingdom
1928 establishments in England